Daniele Polverino (born 24 January 1976) is a retired Italian football striker.

References

1976 births
Living people
Italian footballers
FC St. Gallen players
FC Vaduz players
Italian expatriate footballers
Italian expatriate sportspeople in Liechtenstein
Expatriate footballers in Liechtenstein
FC Chur players
FC Balzers players
FC Schaan players
Association football forwards
Swiss Super League players